Leslie Gordon Corrie (1859–1918) was an architect and the mayor of Brisbane, Queensland from 1902 to 1903. A number of his architectural works are now heritage-listed.

Early life
Leslie Gordon Corrie was born in Hobart, Tasmania in 1859, the son of James Afleck Corrie of Kirkcudbright and Mary Campbell of Edinburgh.

He worked as an architect, first in Hobart and then in Launceston. In 1886, he moved to Brisbane. From 1888 to 1892, he was in partnership with his former employer, Henry Hunter trading as "Hunter and Corrie". From 1898 to 1905, he was in partnership with G.H.M. Addison as Addison and Corrie. At other times he had a solo practice.

He was a founding member of the Queensland Institute of Architects in 1887, and was the vice president of the Institute in 1901.

On 25 March 1899, Corrie married Christina Jane Macpherson at St Thomas' Church, Enfield, Sydney.

Politics
Corrie served as an alderman on the Brisbane Municipal Council from 1901 to 1905 and was mayor in 1902 and 1903. During that time, he served on the following committees:
 1901, 1903: Finance Committee
 1901, 1904, 1905: Legislative Committee
 1901: Concert Hall & Organ Committee
 1901, 1902: Parks Committee
 1901: Town Hall Committee
 1901, 1902: Ferries Committee
 1902, 1905: Works Committee
 1905: Markets Committee
 1902, 1903: Board of Waterworks

Later life
Corrie was interested in horticulture, and was a president of the Queensland Acclimatisation Society. He was involved in introducing and trialling many fruits and plants into Queensland, and is credited with the introduction of the custard apple. He was also a fellow of the Linnean Society of London (a society devoted to natural history).

Corrie died in Brisbane on 2 August 1918. He was buried in Toowong Cemetery on 3 August 1918.

Works

Working as Hunter and Corrie, his works included:
 1889: the Paddock Stand (grandstands) at Eagle Farm Racecourse, Brisbane (in collaboration with John H. Buckeridge)
 1892: extension to Adderton at All Hallows' School, Fortitude Valley, Brisbane
 1889: Queensland Deposit Bank, corner of Adelaide and Albert streets, Brisbane

Working independently, his works included:
 1895: Smithfield Chambers, Gympie

Working as Addison and Corrie, his works included:
 1899:Trustees Chambers, Queen Street, Brisbane
 1900: guest wing and school room at Franklyn Vale Homestead, Grandchester
 1900: Moon's Buildings, Adelaide Street, Brisbane
 1903: Cattle House, Rockhampton

Working independently again, his works included:
 1916: the residence "Manola" constructed for his brother Alexander Corrie, a stockbroker, Bowen Hills, Brisbane

References

External links

1859 births
1918 deaths
Mayors and Lord Mayors of Brisbane
People from Hobart
Burials at Toowong Cemetery
Architects from Brisbane